Hildegard Johanna Maria Trabant (12 June 1927 – 18 August 1964) was an East German woman who became the fiftieth known person to die at the Berlin Wall. Trabant was shot and killed by East German border guards during a crossing attempt, one of only eight women victims of the Berlin Wall, and was the only escapee victim known to have a record of loyalty toward the East German regime.

Biography
 
 
 
 

Hildegard Pohl was born on 12 June 1927 in Berlin, Weimar Republic, and grew up in the city. She was loyal to the East German regime, having joined the governing Socialist Unity Party in 1949 at the age of 22, where she was valued as an active party member. In 1954, she married Günter Horst Trabant, a People's Police officer who was employed in the passport and registration division; the couple had no children due to a lower abdomen operation that rendered Hildegard unable to bear children. The Trabants lived in an apartment complex on Tilsiter Straße 64 (now Richard-Sorge-Straße), in the Friedrichshain district of East Berlin, near U-Bahnhof Frankfurter Tor. Possibly facilitating their residence there, Trabant was a property manager in the Kommunale Wohnungsverwaltung Friedrichshain, a municipal housing administration in Friedrichshain.

Death
On 18 August 1964, Günter Trabant reported to his office that he had not seen his wife since 7:00 in the morning the day prior, 17 August, and that some of her clothes were missing. At 6:50 in the evening the same day, Hildegard Trabant was shot trying to cross the border between East Berlin and West Berlin. Trabant had attempted to leave via a disused S-Bahn line between S-Bhf Berlin-Gesundbrunnen and S-Bhf Berlin-Schönhauser Allee, and had managed to overcome the inner wall, but was discovered by East German border guards as she was hiding behind some shrubs before reaching the other side. She ignored verbal challenges to come out from behind the shrubs and surrender. Instead, she ran back towards the inner wall and East Berlin, to avoid arrest. One of the guards fired a warning shot to get Trabant to stop, but when she continued to run, a second shot was fired, hitting her in the back. Trabant died about an hour later at the "Police Hospital" ("Krankenhaus der Volkspolizei" – now known as the "Army Hospital" ("Bundeswehrkrankenhaus"); she was 37 years old. 

In the presence of his superiors, as well as in the presence of the Stasi case worker, Oberleutnant (First Lieutenant) Horst Hase, her husband Günter was either unable or unwilling to comment on circumstances which led to her attempted flight from East Germany. It is unknown why Trabant decided to flee East Germany. Evidence suggests her motives may have been of a personal nature, possibly involving domestic violence. The Trabants were known to have had several major domestic clashes, which caught the attention of Günter's supervisors within the police force. Sometime after his wife's murder, Günter eventually took residence at Zelle Straße 8B, in Berlin-Friedrichshain, 1.5 Kilometers from Richard-Sorge-Straße 64. He was never in the pre-Wende East Berlin telephone books, but he first appeared in the 1994/95 Berliner Telefonbuch. With the 2002 publishing of the Telefonbuch, he was no longer listed. He was 72 years old. Hildegard had no other known relatives in East Germany at the time of her death, as her mother was deceased, her father was in a nursing home in West Berlin, and her only other known relative, a Günter Pohl, was in Marl-Drewer, North Rhine-Westphalia, in West Germany.

Hildegard Trabant was one of only eight women killed at the Berlin wall, among the total of at least 140 victims, and one of only four women who attempted this crossing alone. Further, of the at least 101 Berlin Wall victims that were classified as escapees or attempted escapees, she was the only one who had a record of loyalty toward the East German regime.

Burial
Hildegard Trabant was buried on 23 September 1964 at the Frieden-Himmelfahrt Cemetery (now the Evangelischer Friedhof Nordend), north of Pankow, in Rosenthal. She was buried in a "linear grave", i.e., a grave which expired after the 20 years allowed under East German law without becoming a "family grave" which the family continued to maintain, or another family member was buried more recently there. This period of resting "expired" in 1984, and this particular section of the cemetery was rearranged. Her urn is still there, like all urns buried there, but it is now under another grave number, and under another name on the tombstone. Her previous grave number was UH Him – 234a and the "new" grave number is UH Him – B102.

Aftermath
Unlike almost all other deaths at the Berlin Wall, Hildegard Trabant's death went totally unnoticed in West Berlin. It would only be 26 years later, after the reunification of Germany in 1990 when the 1964 East Berlin files were given to the German federal judiciary in October 1990. After a lengthy trial, Kurt Renner, the guard who shot her, was found guilty of manslaughter, and sentenced to one year and nine months in prison, which was commuted later to probation. Also unlike almost all other deaths at the Berlin Wall, it was obvious that when she was actually shot she had abandoned her attempt to escape East Berlin, and was merely fleeing back towards the inner wall to avoid arrest.

See also 
 List of deaths at the Berlin Wall
 Berlin Crisis of 1961

References

Further reading
Hans-Hermann Hertle, Maria Nooke: Die Todesopfer an der Berliner Mauer 1961–1989 : ein biographisches Handbuch / hrsg. vom Zentrum für Zeithistorische Forschung Potsdam und der Stiftung Berliner Mauer. Links, Berlin 2009, .

External links

Short Portrait of Hildegard Trabant at Chronik der Mauer
Short Portrait of Hildegard Trabant at Gedenkstätte Berliner Mauer
 Hildegard's Grave
Hildegard Trabant – a  forgotten Berlin Wall victim
(English translation of) The GDR Border Troops' Report on the Escape Attempt of Hildegard Trabant
Exposition: Le Mur de Berlin Berlin vu de l'Est (Exposition: The Berlin Wall, as seen from the East Side)

1927 births
1964 deaths
Deaths at the Berlin Wall
Deaths by firearm in East Germany
People from East Berlin
People from Friedrichshain-Kreuzberg
Burials in Berlin by place